is a light novel publishing imprint of the Japanese publishing company Kadokawa Shoten, a division of Kadokawa Corporation. It was established in 1988 and is aimed at a male audience. Some light novels published under this imprint were serialized in Kadokawa Shoten's light novel magazine The Sneaker, which was published between 1993 and 2011.

Published titles

A

B

C

D

E

F

G

H

I

J

K

L

M

N

O

P

R

S

T

U

V

W

Y

Z

References

External links
 

 
Kadokawa Corporation subsidiaries
Book publishing company imprints
1988 establishments in Japan